Rangpur-1 is a constituency represented in the Jatiya Sangsad (National Parliament) of Bangladesh since 2014 by Moshiur Rahman Ranga of the Jatiya Party (Ershad).

Boundaries 
The constituency encompasses Gangachhara Upazila and wards 1 through 8 of Rangpur City Corporation.

History 
The constituency was created for the first general elections in newly independent Bangladesh, held in 1973.

Ahead of the 2014 general election, the Election Commission reduced the boundaries of the constituency. Previously it had also included three union parishads of Rangpur Sadar Upazila: Haridebpur, Pashuram, and Uttam.

Ahead of the 2018 general election, the Election Commission expanded the boundaries of the constituency to include wards 1 through 8 of Rangpur City Corporation.

Members of Parliament

Elections

Elections in the 2010s 
Moshiur Rahman Ranga was elected unopposed in the 2014 general election after opposition parties withdrew their candidacies in a boycott of the election.

Elections in the 2000s

Elections in the 1990s 

Hussain Muhammad Ershad stood from jail for five seats in the 1991 general election: Rangpur-1, Rangpur-2, Rangpur-3, Rangpur-5, and Rangpur-6. After winning all five, he chose to represent Rangpur-3 and quit the other four, triggering by-elections in them. Karimuddin Bharsa, of the Jatiya Party (Ershad), was elected in a September 1991 by-election.

References

External links
 

Parliamentary constituencies in Bangladesh
Rangpur District